Africa We Go Go is an unauthorized compilation album by British Afro rock band Osibisa released in 1992 by Soundwings Records (MC-102.1075-2) and distributed by Serenade S.A., Barcelona, Spain.

Track listing
All songs written by Teddy Osei, Mac Tontoh and Sol Amarfio, except Woyaya written by Sol Amarfio.

Sources
Tracks 1-5, 8, 10 from African Flight (1981)
Tracks 6-7, 9, 11 from African Criss Cross (1990)

Personnel
Teddy Osei - Saxophone
Sol Amarfio - Drums
Mac Tontoh - Trumpet
Spartacus R - Bass
Robert Bailey - Keyboards
Wendel Richardson - Lead Guitar
Loughty Lasisi Amao - Percussion, Tenor Saxophone
Kiki Djan - Percussion
Daku 'Potato' Adams  – Percussion

References
All information gathered from back CD cover Africa We Go Go (Copyright © 1992 Soundwings Records MC-102.1075-2).
audio-music.info

1992 albums
Osibisa albums